The 22nd Saturn Awards, honoring the best in science fiction, fantasy and horror film and television in 1995, were held on June 25, 1996.

Winners and nominees
Below is a complete list of nominees and winners. Winners are highlighted in bold.

Film

Television

Video

Special awards
George Pal Memorial Award
 John Carpenter
Life Career Award
 Albert R. Broccoli
 Edward R. Pressman
Lifetime Achievement Award
 Harrison Ford
Special Award
 Castle Rock Entertainment
President's Award
 Robert Wise
 Bryan Singer

References

External links
 Official website

Saturn Awards ceremonies
1996 awards
1996 film awards
1996 television awards